
De Gieser Wildeman is a restaurant in Noordeloos, Netherlands. It is a fine dining restaurant that was awarded one Michelin star for the period 2006–present. The choice of name was inspired by two things: the River Giessen, flowing past the restaurant, and the Gieser Wildeman, a type of culinary pear and one of the favourite dishes of the head chef.

GaultMillau awarded the restaurant 15 out of 20 points. 

Head chef of De Gieser Wildeman is René Tichelaar.

The restaurant is a member of Alliance Gastronomique Néerlandaise since 2010.

See also
List of Michelin starred restaurants in the Netherlands

References 

Restaurants in the Netherlands
Michelin Guide starred restaurants in the Netherlands